How to Tame a Real Man (Swedish: Så tuktas en äkta man) is a 1941 Swedish comedy film directed by Ragnar Arvedson and starring Birgit Tengroth, Håkan Westergren and Thor Modéen. It was shot at the Sundbyberg Studios in Stockholm. The film's sets were designed by the art director Max Linder. The following year it was remade as a Finnish film Avioliittoyhtiö.

Synopsis
An interior designer in Stockholm keeps flirting with his pretty female employees. Deciding this is harming his work he decides he needs to hire an unattractive new assistant, and his friend at the local university suggests a gifted candidate. However she is pretty, so he deliberately encourages her to disguise her good looks in order to secure the job.

Cast

 Birgit Tengroth as 	Anne-Marie Hedberg
 Håkan Westergren as 	Göran Brehmer
 Thor Modéen as 	Kalle Fager
 Dagmar Ebbesen as 	Anna Matilda Blid
 Liane Linden as 	Gunilla Gripclou
 Stig Järrel as 	Banker Baltzar Hassler
 Gösta Cederlund as 	Björn Thorelius
 Hugo Björne as 	Charles B. Sjöberg
 Signe Wirff as	Mrs. Sjöberg
 Solveig Hedengran as 	Lillemor Bergling
 Carin Swensson as 	Lady-Friend
 Elly Christiansson as 	Vera
 Gull Natorp as 	Miss Beate-Sophie Gripclou
 Anna-Lisa Baude as 	Doctor's wife
 Åke Engfeldt as Bertil Bergling
 Carl-Gunnar Wingård as 	Constable
 Åke Jensen as 	Carl-Erik
 Siv Ericks as Maud
 Gun Schubert as 	Miss Dahlberg
 Ragnar Widestedt as 	Delmar
 Olav Riégo as 	Solicitor
 Tord Stål as Anne-Maries friend
 Rolf Botvid as 	Anne-Maries friend
 Artur Cederborgh as Director Hallberg
 Lasse Krantz as 	Axel 
 Georg Fernqvist as Maitre d' 
 Karl Erik Flens as Shop assistant
 Anders Frithiof as 	Priest 
 Ann-Margret Bergendahl as Telephone operator 
 Bengt Logardt as Anne-Marie's friend

References

Bibliography 
 Holmstrom, John. The Moving Picture Boy: An International Encyclopaedia from 1895 to 1995. Michael Russell, 1996.

External links 
 

1941 films
Swedish comedy films
1941 comedy films
1940s Swedish-language films
Films directed by Ragnar Arvedson
Films set in Stockholm
1940s Swedish films